Bulbophyllum pinelianum, the rat-tail orchid, is a species of orchid in the genus Bulbophyllum. It is widespread across southern Mexico, the West Indies, Central America and northern South America. It is also reported from Florida but apparently now extinct in that state.

References

External links
US Department of Agriculture plants profile
The Bulbophyllum-Checklist
Atlas of Florida Vascular Plants, Institute for Systematic Botany,  Bulbophyllum
The Internet Orchid Species Photo Encyclopedia
Dennis Giardina. 2013. Lost and found in Cuba, part I. Ghost Writer, newsletter of the Friends of Fakahatchee (Everglades City Florida USA), January 2013
Trinidad and Tobago Nature Link
La Selva Florula Digital, Páginas de Especies: Bulbophyllum pachyrachis, Galería photo gallery

pinelianum
Orchids of Florida
Orchids of Mexico
Orchids of Central America
Orchids of South America
Flora of the Caribbean
Plants described in 1845
Flora without expected TNC conservation status